The Girls of Uppakra (Swedish: Flickorna på Uppåkra) is a 1936 Swedish drama film directed by Alice Eklund and Lorens Marmstedt and starring Stina Hedberg, Isa Quensel and Vera Valdor. It was shot at the Sundbyberg Studios in Stockholm. The film's sets were designed by the art director Max Linder. Is is based on a 1927 novel of the same title.

Synopsis
The widow Marie Brummell lives in Stockholm with her four daughters, but is terrible at managing money. She manages to scrape together enough money to acquire a farm in Uppakra in Scania.

Cast
 Stina Hedberg as Marie Brummell
 Isa Quensel as Elsa Brummell
 Vera Valdor as Brita Brummell
 Marie-Louise Sorbon as 	Ann-Marie Brummell
 Ulla Sorbon as Svea Brummell
 Inga Jansson as 	Ingrid Brummell
 Lauritz Falk as 	Gunnar Broman
 Dagmar Ebbesen as Kristina Broman
 Semmy Friedmann as Eric Dahlberg
 Gösta Cederlund as 	Steen
 Carl Deurell as 	Tradesman Eriksson
 Anna-Lisa Fröberg as 	Secretary 
 Mona Geijer-Falkner as 	Market Customer 
 Nils Hallberg as Rowdy Boy 
 Arne Lindblad as 	Waiter 
 Olav Riégo as 	Bank Manager 
 Stina Sorbon as 	Office Clerk 
 Gösta Terserus as Constable Lagström

References

Bibliography 
 Qvist, Per Olov & von Bagh, Peter. Guide to the Cinema of Sweden and Finland. Greenwood Publishing Group, 2000.

External links 
 

1936 films
Swedish drama films
1936 drama films
1930s Swedish-language films
Films directed by Lorens Marmstedt
Swedish black-and-white films
Films based on Swedish novels
Films set in Stockholm
Films shot in Stockholm
1930s Swedish films